The Siberian thrush (Geokichla sibirica) is a member of the thrush family, Turdidae. The genus name Geokichla comes from Ancient Greek geo-, "ground-" and kikhle, " thrush". The specific sibirica is Latin for Siberia.

It breeds in taiga in Siberia. It is strongly migratory, with most birds moving to southeastern Asia during the winter. It is a very rare vagrant to western Europe. It is very secretive.

The Siberian thrush is similar in size to the song thrush. It is omnivorous, eating a wide range of insects, earthworms and berries.

The male Siberian thrush is a dark blue-grey above and below, with a white stripe above the eye. The lower belly and flanks are white. The female is a much browner bird, with a buff stripe above the eye.

A striking identification feature of both sexes in flight is the black band on the white underwings, a feature shared with the scaly thrush.

References

Siberian thrush
Birds of North Asia
Siberian thrush
Taxa named by Peter Simon Pallas